Montgomery Airport may refer to:
		
 Montgomery Regional Airport in Montgomery, Alabama, United States (FAA: MGM)
 Montgomery Field Airport in San Diego, California, United States (FAA: MYF)
 Virginia Tech Montgomery Executive Airport in Blacksburg, Virginia, United States (FAA: BCB)
 G. V. Montgomery Airport in Forest, Mississippi, United States (FAA: 2M4)

See also 
 Montgomery County Airport (disambiguation)